Fame and Obscurity: A Book About New York, a Bridge, and Celebrities on the Edge was a 1970 book by Gay Talese.  The book was a collection of many of Talese's works for Esquire about New York City, and also includes his most famous celebrity profiles: "Joe Louis: The King as a Middle-aged Man", "Frank Sinatra Has a Cold" and "The Silent Season of a Hero".

1970 books
Works by Gay Talese
Doubleday (publisher) books